Ken Scott (born Kenneth E. Schibath;  October 13, 1928 – December 2, 1986) was an American actor best known for his work in films in the 1950s and on television after that.

Biography
Born in Brooklyn, New York, Scott was the son of interior decorator Ernst Schibath and attended school at Erasmus Hall High School and Colby Academy.  He worked as a truck driver, an artist, an actor, a salesman and finally a TV announcer at WDSU-TV in New Orleans.  Discovered by producer Buddy Adler on a television show, he was contracted to 20th Century Fox on Oct. 8, 1956 with his first work narrating the film Three Brave Men. 

He had lead roles in several of the studio's API second features and made appearances in some of Fox's major films.  Following his years at Fox he appeared as a guest star on numerous American television series,

Scott was cast as Johnny Ringo in the 1963 episode, "The Melancholy Gun", of the syndicated television anthology series, Death Valley Days, hosted by Stanley Andrews. In the story line, Ringo, an expert gunslinger with a mysterious past seeks to lead a more respectable life. However, many want to make their reputations by challenging Ringo's shooting skills. Elizabeth MacRae was cast as his romantic interest, Myra Engles . Denver Pyle played a physician in this episode. 

In the 1964 Death Valley Days episode, "Trial at Belle Springs", Scott played the historical Virgil Earp, who goes undercover to break a robbery ring run by Belle Wilgus (Lynn Bari).

In 1965, Scott teamed up again with McRae (under a more jaded romantic interest) in the S10E20 offering “Circus Trick” on Gunsmoke.

Select credits

Three Brave Men (1956) – Naval Investigator (uncredited)
The True Story of Jesse James (1957) 
The Way to the Gold (1957) – Intern
The Three Faces of Eve (1957) – Earl
Stopover Tokyo (1957) – Tony Barrett
From Hell to Texas (1958) – Otis Boyd
The Bravados (1958) – Primo – Deputy Sheriff
The Fiend Who Walked the West (1958) – Paul Finney
Woman Obsessed (1959) – Sergeant Le Moyne
This Earth Is Mine (1959) – Luigi Griffanti
A Private's Affair (1959) – Sgt. Tevlin (uncredited)
Five Gates to Hell (1959) – Dr. John Richter
Beloved Infidel (1959) – Robinson
Desire in the Dust (1960) – Lonnie Wilson
The Fiercest Heart (1961) – Harry Carter
Pirates of Tortuga (1961) – Bart Paxton
The Second Time Around (1961) – Sheriff Burns
Police Nurse (1963) – Art Devlin
Raiders from Beneath the Sea (1964) –  Bill Harper
The Naked Brigade (1965) – Christo
The Murder Game (1965) – Steve Baldwin
Fantastic Voyage (1966) – Secret Service
Batman (1967) – Riddler henchman (Down)
The St. Valentine's Day Massacre (1967) – Policeman (uncredited)
Psych-Out (1968) – Preacher
The Roommates (1973) – Marty
The Gumball Rally (1976)
The Boob Tube Strikes Again! (1977) – Rabbi
Double Exposure (1983) – Husband

References

External links
 
 

1928 births
1986 deaths
20th Century Studios contract players
American male film actors
American male television actors
People from Brooklyn
20th-century American male actors